Mission Hills, California may refer to:

 Mission Hills, Santa Barbara County, California, a census-designated place 
 Mission Hills, Los Angeles, a suburban neighborhood
 Mission Hills, San Diego, an old subdivision and upscale affluent neighborhood

See also
 Mission Hills (disambiguation)
 Mission Hills High School, in San Marcos, California